A Major Historical and Cultural Site Protected at the National Level, often abbreviated as guobao ("nationally protected"), is one of 5,058  monuments listed as of significant historical, artistic or scientific value by the State Administration of Cultural Heritage, which is the cultural relics administrative department of the State Council of China.  This is the highest level of cultural heritage register in China at the national level, although there are much wider registers of protected sites at the provincial level, the city level, and so on.

As Sites Protected at the National Level are lawfully the monuments with protection of the highest level in China, it is prohibited to damage or demolish them. An approval by the State Administration of Cultural Heritage is required before a potential removal of such sites.

Statistics
In 1999 it was reported that there were some 350,000 immovable cultural properties in China, of which 70,000 were protected at one of the three main levels, in addition to some 10,000,000 movable cultural properties held by state institutions alone. Of these, as of October 2019, 5,058 Sites Protected at the National Level have been designated by the State Administration. They were announced in 8 batches and several supplemental batches:

Sites protected at various levels 
Sites (to Be) Protected for Their Historical and Cultural Value or Historical and Cultural Sites Protected at various levels include:

 Major Historical and Cultural Sites Protected at the National Level
 Historical and Cultural Sites Protected at the Provincial Level
 Historical and Cultural Sites Protected at the Level of a City Divided into Districts or at the Level of an Autonomous Prefecture
 Historical and Cultural Sites Protected at the County Level

See also
 Principles for the Conservation of Heritage Sites in China
 World Heritage Sites in China
 Tourist Attraction Rating Categories of China

Notes

References

 
Historic sites in China
.
Heritage registers in China
.
.
.
Chinese architectural history